Hungert is a hill near Caldern, Hesse, Germany.

References 

Hills of Hesse